Mexicomiris is a genus of plant bugs in the family Miridae. There are about seven described species in Mexicomiris.

Species
These seven species belong to the genus Mexicomiris:
 Mexicomiris myrmecoides Carvalho & Schaffner, 1973
 Mexicomiris peudoxenetoides Barros de Carvalho & Schaffner
 Mexicomiris puelbensis Carvalho & Schaffner, 1975
 Mexicomiris quercicola Barros de Carvalho & Schaffner
 Mexicomiris querciola Carvalho & Schaffner, 1975
 Mexicomiris rubidus Carvalho & Schaffner, 1973
 Mexicomiris texanus Carvalho, 1986

References

Further reading

 
 
 

Miridae genera
Articles created by Qbugbot
Herdoniini